Bartlett House may refer to:

in the United States
(by state, then city/town)
Samuel L. Bartlett House, Phoenix, Arizona, listed on the National Register of Historic Places (NRHP) in Maricopa County
Bartlett-Kirk House, Batesville, Arkansas, listed on the NRHP in Independence County
Daniel and Esther Bartlett House, Redding, Connecticut, listed on the NRHP in Fairfield County
Call-Bartlett House, Arlington, Massachusetts, listed on the NRHP in Middlesex County
Bartlett-Russell-Hedge House, Plymouth, Massachusetts, listed on the NRHP in Plymouth County
J.C. Bartlett House, Taunton, Massachusetts, listed on the NRHP in Bristol County
Thomas and Maria Blackman Bartlett House, Cherry Hill, Michigan, listed on the NRHP in Wayne County
Francis H. Bartlett House, Wykoff, Minnesota, listed on the NRHP in Fillmore County
Jack Bartlett House, Bozeman, Montana, listed on the NRHP in Gallatin County
John J. and Lenora Bartlett House, Kearney, Nebraska, listed on the NRHP in Buffalo County
George A. Bartlett House, Tonopah, Nevada, listed on the NRHP in Nye County
Bartlett-Rockhill-Bartlett House, Tuckerton, New Jersey, listed on the NRHP in Ocean County
Bartlett House (Ghent, New York), listed on the NRHP in Columbia County
Josiah Bartlett House, Kingston, New Hampshire, listed on the NRHP in Rockingham County
Joseph and Rachel Bartlett House, Fremont, Ohio, listed on the NRHP in Sandusky County
Robert Rensselaer Bartlett House, Astoria, Oregon, listed on the NRHP in Clatsop County
L.L. Bartlett House, Stoneville, South Dakota, listed on the NRHP in Meade County
Peter Bartlett House, Maryville, Tennessee, listed on the NRHP in Blount County
Frank Bartlett House, Port Townsend, Washington, listed on the NRHP in Jefferson County